The 2006 Wirral Metropolitan Borough Council election took place on 4 May 2006 to elect members of Wirral Metropolitan Borough Council in England. This election was held on the same day as other local elections. 

After the election, the composition of the council was:

Election results

Overall election result

Overall result compared with 2004.

Ward results
Results compared directly with the last local election in 2004.

Bebington

Bidston and St James

Birkenhead and Tranmere

Bromborough

Clatterbridge

Claughton

Eastham

Greasby, Frankby and Irby

Heswall

Hoylake and Meols

Leasowe and Moreton East

Liscard

Moreton West and Saughall Massie

New Brighton

Oxton

Pensby and Thingwall

Prenton

Rock Ferry

Seacombe

Upton

Wallasey

West Kirby and Thurstason

Notes

• italics denote the sitting councillor • bold denotes the winning candidate

References 

2006 English local elections
2006
2000s in Merseyside